The 16th European Film Awards were presented on December 6, 2003 in Berlin, Germany. The winners were selected by the members of the European Film Academy.

Awards

Best Film

Lifetime Achievement Award

References

External links 
 European Film Academy Archive

2003 film awards
European Film Awards ceremonies
2003 in German cinema
2003 in Europe